Dario Morello (born 11 January 1968, in Lecce) is a retired Italian professional footballer who played as a midfielder.

Honours
Inter
 Serie A champion: 1988–89.
 Supercoppa Italiana winner: 1989.

1968 births
Living people
Italian footballers
Serie A players
Serie B players
Serie C players
Inter Milan players
A.C. Reggiana 1919 players
Bologna F.C. 1909 players
Genoa C.F.C. players
U.S. Sassuolo Calcio players
Association football midfielders